SS Stephen Beasley was a Liberty ship built in the United States during World War II. She was named after Stephen Beasley, an American shipbuilder from Philadelphia, Pennsylvania, during the early years of the Republic.

Construction
Stephen Beasley was laid down on 13 May 1944, under a Maritime Commission (MARCOM) contract, MC hull 2483, by the St. Johns River Shipbuilding Company, Jacksonville, Florida; sponsored by Eleanor Garrett Bunker, the wife of Rear Admiral Charles W.O. Bunker and the great-great-granddaughter of the namesake, and was launched on 24 June 1944.

History
She was allocated to the T.J. Stevenson & Co., Inc., on 13 July 1944. On 17 December 1948, she was laid up in the National Defense Reserve Fleet, Beaumont, Texas. She was sold for scrapping, 14 March 1961, to Luria Bros. and Co., for $61,789.22. She was removed from the fleet on 28 March 1961.

References

Bibliography

 
 
 
 

 

Liberty ships
Ships built in Jacksonville, Florida
1944 ships
Beaumont Reserve Fleet